Lanelater is a genus of click beetle belonging to the family Elateridae.

List of species
 Lanelater acuminatus (Fleutiaux, 1935)
 Lanelater aequalis (Candèze, 1857)
 Lanelater afoveatus Vats & Kashyap, 1993
 Lanelater arabicus (Candèze, 1874)
 Lanelater arenarum Platia & Schimmel, 1997
 Lanelater attenuatus (Candèze, 1874)
 Lanelater australis (Candèze, 1874)
 Lanelater babaulti (Fleutiaux, 1918)
 Lanelater badeni (Candèze, 1889)
 Lanelater bartoni (Fleutiaux, 1902)
 Lanelater bifoveatus (Candèze, 1857)
 Lanelater bipunctatus (Candèze, 1857)
 Lanelater bradshawi (Candèze, 1889)
 Lanelater buettikeri Chassain, 1983
 Lanelater capensis Girard, 2008
 Lanelater cinereus (Candèze, 1857)
 Lanelater confusus (Fleutiaux, 1935)
 Lanelater crassiusculus (Candèze, 1857)
 Lanelater crassiventris (Schwarz, 1899)
 Lanelater densus Vats & Kashyap, 1993
 Lanelater dewalquei (Candèze, 1857)
 Lanelater divergens (Fairmaire, 1892)
 Lanelater ereptus (Candèze, 1874)
 Lanelater fallaciosus (Fairmaire, 1892)
 Lanelater fleutiauxi Hayek, 1973
 Lanelater fuscipes (Fabricius, 1775)
 Lanelater fusiformis (Candèze, 1857)
 Lanelater gestroi (Candèze, 1880)
 Lanelater glabratus (Gyllenhal, 1817)
 Lanelater glabrosus Vats & Kashyap, 1993
 Lanelater grandis (Hope, 1842)
 Lanelater gutturosus (Fairmaire, 1884)
 Lanelater hageni (Candèze, 1887)
 Lanelater hayekae Spilman, 1985
 Lanelater infuscatus (Klug, 1855)
 Lanelater insularis Fairmaire
 Lanelater javanus (Candèze, 1857)
 Lanelater judaicus (Reiche & Saulcy, 1857)
 Lanelater labeculatus (Candèze, 1892)
 Lanelater lacertosus (Candèze, 1857)
 Lanelater laosensis Ôhira, 1970
 Lanelater laticollis (Hope, 1843)
 Lanelater latior (W.J. Macleay, 1872)
 Lanelater longicollis (Candèze, 1889)
 Lanelater longicornis (Gahan, 1900)
 Lanelater lopezi (Fleutiaux, 1934)
 Lanelater lucerus Vats & Kashyap, 1993
 Lanelater luridus (Fabricius, 1781)
 Lanelater maculicollis (Gerstaecker, 1871)
 Lanelater mastersii (W.J. Macleay, 1872)
 Lanelater modestus (Schwarz, 1902)
 Lanelater moseri (Schwarz, 1903)
 Lanelater mucronatus (Candèze, 1857)
 Lanelater namibiensis Girard, 2008
 Lanelater natalensis Girard, 2008
 Lanelater naviauxi Chassain, 1983
 Lanelater nicoleae Wappler, 2003
 Lanelater nitidus (Fleutiaux, 1918)
 Lanelater notodonta (Latreille, 1827)
 Lanelater olcesii (Fairmaire, 1884)
 Lanelater opacus (Candèze, 1878)
 Lanelater pacificus (Candèze, 1882)
 Lanelater parallelicollis (Candèze, 1889)
 Lanelater parvus Platia & Schimmel, 1997
 Lanelater peringueyi (Candèze, 1889)
 Lanelater permucronatus (Schwarz, 1902)
 Lanelater persicus (Candèze, 1874)
 Lanelater pescadorensis (Miwa, 1934)
 Lanelater politus (Candèze, 1857)
 Lanelater ponderatus (Candèze, 1897)
 Lanelater proximus (Fleutiaux, 1935)
 Lanelater puber (Candèze, 1857)
 Lanelater pubescens (Candèze, 1857)
 Lanelater pumilus (Candèze, 1889)
 Lanelater resectus (Candèze, 1857)
 Lanelater robustus (Fleutiaux, 1902)
 Lanelater rubiginosus (Candèze, 1865)
 Lanelater rufus (Candèze, 1857)
 Lanelater sallei (LeConte, 1853)
 Lanelater saudarabicus Chassain, 1983
 Lanelater schotti (LeConte, 1853)
 Lanelater scortecci (Binaghi, 1941)
 Lanelater scutopentagonus Vats & Kashyap, 1993
 Lanelater semicribrosus (Fairmaire, 1887)
 Lanelater semistriatus (Schwarz, 1899)
 Lanelater sobrinus (Candèze, 1887)
 Lanelater soricinus (Candèze, 1882)
 Lanelater substriatus (Candèze, 1857)
 Lanelater tomentosus (Fabricius, 1798)
 Lanelater transvaalensis Girard, 2008
 Lanelater uhligi Girard, 2008
 Lanelater verae Troster, 1993
 Lanelater vishvai Vats & Kashyap, 1993
 Lanelater wittmeri Chassain, 1983

References 

 Biolib
 Synopsis of the described coleoptera of the world

Elateridae genera